Leonard Andrei Manole (born 19 April 1993) is a Romanian footballer who plays for Sporting Roșiori. He made his Liga I debut on 16 September 2013 for Vaslui, in a match against Poli Timişoara.

Club career

Argeş Piteşti
Manole began his professional career with his home club Argeş Piteşti. He made his debut for Argeş Piteşti on 9 October 2010 as a second-half substitute for Ionuţ Murineanu against Arieşul Turda.

Vaslui
Although he was supposed to sign a four–year contract with Astra Giurgiu following Argeş Piteşti's disaffiliation, he ended up signing with Vaslui. He made his debut in a 1–0 home victory against Poli Timişoara, coming in as a substitute for Vaslui captain Lucian Sânmărtean. He was handed the number 10 jersey, left vacant following the departure of Nicolae Stanciu.

International career

While involved with the Romania national under-19 football team, Manole photographed himself with controversial Serbian figure Ratko Butorović. As a result, he was banned from representing Romania for six months.

Statistics 

Statistics accurate as of match played 24 September 2013

References

External links
 
 

1993 births
Living people
People from Ștefănești, Argeș
Romanian footballers
Association football midfielders
Romania youth international footballers
Romania under-21 international footballers
Liga I players
Liga II players
Liga III players
FC Argeș Pitești players
FC Vaslui players
CS Sportul Snagov players
FCV Farul Constanța players
ACS Viitorul Târgu Jiu players
CSM Reșița players